The Jin Xing Show is a Chinese variety show hosted by Jin Xing. Broadcast weekly, it has an estimated audience of 100 million.

References

Chinese television talk shows